The 1896 West Virginia Mountaineers football team was an American football team that represented West Virginia University during the 1896 college football season. In its first and only season under head coach Thomas Trenchard, the team compiled a 3–7–2 record and was outscored by a combined total of 101 to 14. Three of the team's losses were to the  Lafayette team that has been recognized as the co-national champion for 1896. George Krebs was the team captain.

Schedule

References

West Virginia
West Virginia Mountaineers football seasons
West Virginia Mountaineers football